Conaway may refer to:

People
Cristi Conaway, American actress and fashion designer
Frank M. Conaway, Jr., American politician who represents the 40th legislative district in the Maryland House of Delegates
Gertrude Conaway Vanderbilt (1901-1978), American socialite and philanthropist
Herb Conaway, American politician representing the 7th legislative district of New Jersey
Jeff Conaway, American actor
Joan W. Conaway, American biochemist
John B. Conaway, retired U.S. Air Force officer who served as the Chief of the National Guard Bureau
Mike Conaway, Republican from Texas who represents that state's 11th congressional district

Places
Conaway Ranch, a ranch in Yolo County, California